= San José Banda =

Village and municipality in Argentina

Coordinates: 26°46′S 66°05′W

- Municipality and village
- Interactive map of San José Banda
- Country: Argentina
- Province: Catamarca Province
- Time zone: UTC−3 (ART)

San José Banda is a village and municipality in Catamarca Province in northwestern Argentina.
